Zosimas of Solovki (died 1478) was one of the founders of the Solovetsky Monastery established on the Solovetsky Islands in the White Sea of northern Russia.

The origin of Zosima is not exactly clear. By 1436 his parents were both dead, and he decided to live as a hermit. In the mouth of the Suma River he met Herman, a monk, who previously spent several years with Savvatiy on Bolshoy Solovetsky Island. Savvatiy died in 1435, and Herman returned to the continent. Zosima and Herman traveled again to Solovetsky Islands, and soon monks started to arrive there. These monks considered themselves the disciples of Zosima. Soon he had to build a wooden church and to organize the monks into a monastery. The monastery was subordinate to Eparchy of Novgorod. The bishop of Novgorod, Iona, twice appointed hegumens to the monastery, but these hegumens left without being able to bear the conditions of life in a Northern island. Then he appointed Zosima as a hegumen.

In 1465, Zosima built a new church and transferred the relics of Savvatiy to this church. He died in 1478. Already during his tenure, Solovetsky Monastery obtained big investments from Novgorod Republic and established itself as one of the richest monasteries in Russia.

Since 1547, Zosima is venerated as a saint by the Russian Orthodox Church.

References 

1478 deaths
Russian Orthodox monks
Russian saints of the Eastern Orthodox Church
White Sea
15th-century Christian saints
Year of birth unknown